Antonios Mavromichalis (1792–1873) was a Greek revolutionary, military officer and politician.

Biography
He was born in Mani to Pierros Mavromichalis, of the notable Mavromichalis clan. He fought against Ali Pasha, and was captured and remained for years in Constantinople as a Turkish hostage. He managed to escape however shortly before the outbreak of the Greek War of Independence, subsequently participating in various battles. In 1823 he was named general of the rebels' irregular forces.

In 1830, he led a Maniot rebellion against Governor Ioannis Kapodistrias. Under King Otto, he joined the newly created Greek Gendarmerie and later transferred to the regular army, reaching general rank. He served as Otto's aide-de-camp and was appointed a member of the Senate in 1847. In 1862, he was an MP for Kalamata.

He died in Kalamata in 1873. He had two sons, both Army officers: Periklis Pierrakos-Mavromichalis, and Georgios P. Mavromichalis, who was killed during the Greco-Turkish War of 1897.

1792 births
1873 deaths
Hellenic Army generals
19th-century Greek people
Antonios
Greek military leaders of the Greek War of Independence
Members of the Greek Senate
Greek escapees
Escapees from Turkish detention
Greek MPs 1862–1864
Maniots